"Take Care Of Yourself" is a song released by the British pop/jazz-funk group Level 42 in 1989. The song was released on the compilation Level Best. It was the last song recorded with guitarist Alan Murphy, who died on October 19, 1989, three days after the single was issued. The music video is a retrospective of rock styles from the 60s through to the 80s, and features (for that time) state-of-the-art animation. In some ways it is reminiscent of the video "We Close Our Eyes" by Go West.  Lindup, Husband and King appear several times dressed as hippies, punks and heavy metal musicians. Murphy did not appear in this video, but does appear in a video alongside King, Lindup and Husband recorded for RTL Veronique a few days before his death: https://www.youtube.com/watch?v=YsW9sFx3VU0&ab_channel=eightiesandmore

Track listing 
"Take Care Of Yourself" (4:35) Producer - Level 42 Written-By - M. King  
   "Silence" (Live) (5:00) Producer - Julian Mendelsohn, Level 42, Wally Badarou Written-By - M. Lindup  
"Man" (Live) (7:07) Producer - Julian Mendelsohn, Level 42, Wally Badarou Written-By - R. Gould, M. King, W. Badarou

Personnel
Mark King - Bass/Vocals
Mike Lindup - Keyboards/Vocals
Gary Husband - Drums
Alan Murphy - Guitars

Level 42 songs
1989 singles
1989 songs
Polydor Records singles
Songs written by Mark King (musician)